The Hermit is a  mountain summit located west of the crest of the Sierra Nevada mountain range, in Fresno County of central California, United States. The John Muir Trail passes to the east and north of this landmark, providing an approach. This geographical feature was named by Sierra Club explorer Theodore Solomons in 1895 as he wrote:
"The traveler will be greatly attracted by a very sharp peak or butte that rises on the south wall. From its isolated position as viewed from the valley we called it the Hermit."

Climate
According to the Köppen climate classification system, The Hermit is located in an alpine climate zone. Most weather fronts originate in the Pacific Ocean, and travel east toward the Sierra Nevada mountains. As fronts approach, they are forced upward by the peaks, causing them to drop their moisture in the form of rain or snowfall onto the range (orographic lift). Precipitation runoff from this mountain drains to Evolution Creek which is a San Joaquin River tributary.

Climbing
The first ascent of the mountain is credited to Leonard Keeler, Ralph Brandt, Marion Avery, and Margaret Avery on July 2, 1924. George R. Bunn climbed it July 28, 1924, declaring the final 20-foot summit slab as unclimbable, and Sierra Club mountaineers James Rennie and Norman Clyde climbed it on August 2, 1925. Due to exposure, rope is recommended for the final  summit block, although one source claims that the south side of the summit block can be climbed by employing a "shaky shoulder stand."

Established routes on The Hermit:

 East side from Evolution Lake – 
 Southwest slope via McGee Canyon – class 2 
 North Ridge – class 3 – FA 1936, by Richard G. Johnson, Peter Grubb
 Northwest Face – class 3 – FA 1939, by Harriet Parsons, Madi Bacon, Maxine Cushing

Gallery

See also

 List of mountain peaks of California
 Mount McGee

References

External links

 Weather forecast: The Hermit

Mountains of Fresno County, California
Mountains of Kings Canyon National Park
North American 3000 m summits
Mountains of Northern California
Sierra Nevada (United States)